This is a list of defunct airlines of Oman.

Defunct airlines

See also
 List of airlines of Oman
 List of airports in Oman

References

Airlines
Airlines, defunct
Oman